The World Ninepin Bowling Classic Championships were a biennial nine-pin bowling competitions organized by the World Ninepin Bowling Association (WNBA NBC). The World Championships was started in 1953 and until 1959 took place every two years. The next one was held in 1962 with the assumption of alternating with the European Championships every two years. In 1966, this concept was abandoned and thereafter the championships were biennial until 2004.

Since 2005, the competition has been divided. Team are held in odd years, while Singles in even years.

The following list shows when new events were added for the first time:
1953, singles and team events as first events.
1966, pair competitions were added.
1990, combination competitions were added.
1994, separation of team competition into two divisions A and B.
2004, sprint and mixed tandem competitions added. An individual event on a distance of 120 throws for the first time.

List of championships

Medal count

List of hosts
List of hosts by the number of championships hosted.

References

 
World championships in ninepin bowling classic
Recurring sporting events established in 1953